In software engineering, the singleton pattern is a software design pattern that restricts the instantiation of a class to a singular instance. One of the well-known "Gang of Four" design patterns, which describe how to solve recurring problems in object-oriented software, the pattern is useful when exactly one object is needed to coordinate actions across a system.

More specifically, the singleton pattern allows objects to:
 Ensure they only have one instance
 Provide easy access to that instance
 Control their instantiation (for example, hiding the constructors of a class)

The term comes from the mathematical concept of a singleton.

Common uses 
Singletons are often preferred to global variables because they do not pollute the global namespace (or their containing namespace). Additionally, they permit lazy allocation and initialization, whereas global variables in many languages will always consume resources.

The singleton pattern can also be used as a basis for other design patterns, such as the abstract factory, factory method, builder and prototype patterns. Facade objects are also often singletons because only one facade object is required.

Logging is a common real-world use case for singletons, because all objects that wish to log messages require a uniform point of access and conceptually write to a single source.

Implementations 
Implementations of the singleton pattern ensure that only one instance of the singleton class ever exists and typically provide global access to that instance.

Typically, this is accomplished by:
 Declaring all constructors of the class to be private, which prevents it from being instantiated by other objects
 Providing a static method that returns a reference to the instance
The instance is usually stored as a private static variable; the instance is created when the variable is initialized, at some point before when the static method is first called.

The following demonstrates an example implementation in Java:

public class Coin {

    private static final int ADD_MORE_COIN = 10;
    private int coin;
    private static Coin instance = new Coin(); // eagerly loads the singleton

    private Coin() {
        // private to prevent anyone else from instantiating
    }

    public static Coin getInstance() {
        return instance;
    }

    public int getCoin() {
        return coin;
    }

    public void addMoreCoin() {
        coin += ADD_MORE_COIN;
    }

    public void deductCoin() {
        coin--;
    }
}

Lazy initialization 

A singleton implementation may use lazy initialization in which the instance is created when the static method is first invoked. In multithreaded programs, this can cause race conditions that result in the creation of multiple instances. The following Java example is a thread-safe implementation, using lazy initialization with double-checked locking.

public class Singleton {

    private static volatile Singleton instance = null;

    private Singleton() {}

    public static Singleton getInstance() {
        if (instance == null) {
            synchronized(Singleton.class) {
                if (instance == null) {
                    instance = new Singleton();
                }
            }
        }

        return instance;
    }
}

Criticism 
Some consider the singleton to be an anti-pattern that introduces global state into an application, often unnecessarily. This introduces a potential dependency on the singleton by other objects, requiring analysis of implementation details to determine whether a dependency actually exists. This increased coupling can introduce difficulties with unit testing. In turn, this places restrictions on any abstraction that uses the singleton, such as preventing concurrent use of multiple instances.

Singletons also violate the single-responsibility principle because they are responsible for enforcing their own uniqueness along with performing their normal functions.

See also 
 Initialization-on-demand holder idiom
 Multiton pattern
 Software design pattern

References

External links 

 Complete article "Java Singleton Pattern Explained" 
 Four different ways to implement singleton in Java "Ways to implement singleton in Java" 
 Book extract: Implementing the Singleton Pattern in C# by Jon Skeet
 Singleton at Microsoft patterns & practices Developer Center
 IBM article "Double-checked locking and the Singleton pattern" by Peter Haggar
 
 Google Singleton Detector (analyzes Java bytecode to detect singletons)

Software design patterns
Anti-patterns
Articles with example Java code